Howard Wayne Kindig, Jr. (born June 22, 1941) is a former American football defensive end who played ten seasons in the American Football League and the National Football League, mainly with the Buffalo Bills.

Kindig started his NFL career as a defensive end with the San Diego Chargers in 1965.  After 3 seasons with San Diego he moved to the Bills, where he played defensive end, offensive tackle and center.  Kindig decided to retire after the 1971 season with the Bills, but the Miami Dolphins traded for his rights in exchange for defensive tackle Frank Cornish and a conditional draft pick, and Dolphins coach Don Shula was able to convince Kindig to unretire.  Kindig was able to make the Dolphins 1972 team after Jim Langer beat out Miami's 1971 starting center Bob DeMarco for the 1972 starting center position and DeMarco did not want to serve as the backup, opening a spot for Kindig.

Kindig was the long snapper for the undefeated 1972 Miami Dolphins, which completed a 17-0 season by defeating the Washington Redskins in Super Bowl VII. After the Super Bowl, Redskin coach George Allen claimed that one of the key plays in Miami's victory was a penalty Kindig drew on Washington linebacker Harold McLinton, when McLinton attempted to steal the ball from Kindig when he was long snapping on a punt, and the penalty allowed Miami to retain possession of the ball.  Kindig broke his thumb during the 1973 preseason and missed the entire season, in which Miami won a 2nd consecutive Super Bowl.

Kindig was traded by Miami to the Redskins before the 1974 season in exchange for a draft pick, but was cut by the Redskins before the 1974 season began.  He started the 1974 season with the Jacksonville Sharks of the World Football League after signing a contract that was supposed to pay him $75,000 per year for three years. He signed with the NFL New York Jets after the Sharks stopped paying its players and disbanded in the middle of the 1974 season. He returned to the WFL with the Jacksonville Express for the 1975 season but was released before the end of the season.

After retiring from football for good Kindig ran a real estate and appraisal company.

See also
Other American Football League players

References

1941 births
Living people
People from Mexico, Missouri
Players of American football from Missouri
American football centers
American football defensive ends
American football offensive tackles
San Diego Chargers players
Buffalo Bills players
Miami Dolphins players
New York Jets players
Cal State Los Angeles Diablos football players
American Football League players
Jacksonville Sharks (WFL) players
Jacksonville Express players